Alphons Magg (14 July 1891 – 8 December 1967) was a Swiss sculptor. His work was part of the sculpture event in the art competition at the 1936 Summer Olympics.

References

1891 births
1967 deaths
20th-century Swiss sculptors
Swiss sculptors
Olympic competitors in art competitions
Artists from Zürich
20th-century Swiss male artists